Maffeo Vitale, O.F.M. (died 23 June 1669) was a Roman Catholic prelate who served as Bishop of Mantua (1646–1669).

Biography
Maffeo Vitale was ordained a priest in the Order of Friars Minor. 
On 5 February 1646, he was appointed during the papacy of Pope Innocent X as Bishop of Mantua.
On 11 February 1646, he was consecrated bishop by Giovanni Giacomo Panciroli, Cardinal-Priest of Santo Stefano al Monte Celio, with Alfonso Gonzaga, Titular Archbishop of Rhodus, and Girolamo Farnese, Titular Archbishop of Patrae, serving as co-consecrators. 
He served as Bishop of Mantua until his death on 23 June 1669.

While bishop, he was the principal co-consecrator of Benedetto Odescalchi, Bishop of Novara (1651); and Rinaldo d'Este, Bishop of Reggio Emilia (1651).

References

External links and additional sources
 (for Chronology of Bishops) 
 (for Chronology of Bishops) 

17th-century Italian Roman Catholic bishops
Bishops of Mantua
Bishops appointed by Pope Innocent X
1669 deaths
Franciscan bishops